Ouled Farès District is a district of Chlef Province, Algeria.

Communes 
The district is further divided into 3 communes:

 Ouled Fares 
 Chettia 
 Labiod Medjadja

References

Districts of Chlef Province